Henry Chester Bruton (15 March  1905 – 15 August 1992) was a rear admiral in the United States Navy, becoming Director of Naval Communications in the 1950s. For his actions during World War II, he was awarded the Navy Cross three times and the Legion of Merit twice. He received the Legion of Merit twice more for contributions to the US Cold War effort in the 1950s, retiring in 1960.

Background and education
Bruton was born in Belleville, Arkansas in 1905. He graduated from the United States Naval Academy in 1926, and in the 1930s studied electrical engineering at the Naval Postgraduate School and the University of California, Berkeley, receiving a master's degree from the latter. He later also graduated in law from the George Washington University Law School, becoming a member of the Order of the Coif.

Career

During World War II, he first commanded the submarine . Bruton was three times awarded the Navy Cross for his command of the Greenling in four wartime patrols, in which it sank 75,000 tons of shipping, including a destroyer attacking it. The Greenling was awarded the Presidential Unit Citation, and Bruton was named a submarine division commander in 1943.

Later, Bruton was named Chief of Staff of the Submarine Force, U.S. Atlantic Fleet and Director of the Legislative Division of the Judge Advocate General's Corps. 

During the Korean War, Bruton commanded the battleship ; in early 1952, the vessel carried out shore bombardments. After the war, he became Director of Naval Communications, and from 1958 until his retirement in 1960 he was communications-electronics director of the Joint Staff of the Commander-in-Chief of the European Command. 

After his retirement he worked for Collins Radio until 1964, before becoming secretary-treasurer of the Armed Forces Relief and Benefit Association, and from 1966 a consultant to the Military Benefit Association.

Bruton was awarded the Legion of Merit with award star. In addition, he was authorized to wear the Submarine Combat Patrol insignia.

Awards
 Navy Cross (3) - awarded for actions during World War II
 Legion of Merit (4) - awarded twice for actions during World War II, once for contribution to Operation Castle, and once "for exceptionally meritorious and distinguished service in a position of great responsibility to the Government of the United States as Director, Communications-Electronics Division, Headquarters, United States European Command, from 30 June 1958 to 31 July 1960."

References

United States Navy rear admirals
United States submarine commanders
United States Naval Academy alumni
United States Navy personnel of World War II
United States Navy personnel of the Korean War
Recipients of the Navy Cross (United States)
Recipients of the Legion of Merit
University of California, Berkeley alumni
George Washington University Law School alumni
People from Yell County, Arkansas
Deaths from cancer in Maryland
1905 births
1992 deaths